Cashel Community School is  secondary school in Cashel, County Tipperary in Ireland. It was opened In 1994 It is an amalgamation of three former schools in the town; the Presentation Convent girls school, boys Christian Brothers school and Vocational school.

Sport
On 3 February 2015 they defeated CBS Sexton Street of Limerick 4–5 on penalties after a 1–1 draw after extra time to reach the Umbro Senior Boys Cup Final.

The Cashel team recently made it to the semifinal of the 2023 Harty Cup against Thurles CBS. The outcome is still pending.

Notable alumni
Angela Kerins (Presentation Convent)
John Gallagher (Current Principal)

References

Community schools in the Republic of Ireland
Secondary schools in County Tipperary
1994 establishments in Ireland
Educational institutions established in 1994